Sagacity may refer to:

 Wisdom, or sagacity, the ability to think and act using knowledge, experience, understanding, common sense and insight
 Sagacity (Saga album), a 2014 music album by Saga
 Sagacity Media, an American publishing company
 USS Sagacity, the name of two U.S. Navy ships

See also

Sage (disambiguation)